Blasphemer may refer to:
 Blasphemer, a person who commits blasphemy
 The Blasphemer, a 1921 American silent drama film
 Blasphemer, the stage name of Rune Eriksen (b. 1975), a Norwegian guitarist formerly of the black metal group Mayhem

See also 
 Blasphemy (disambiguation)